Uthura Union is a union parishad under Bhaluka Upazila of Mymensingh District in the division of Mymensingh, Bangladesh.

Geography 
Uthura Union is bounded by Bhabanipur, Mokshapur, Enayetpur, Dakatia, and Meduary Union.

Demographics 
According to the National Bureau of Statistics of Bangladesh census report, the number of population was 28,178 in 2011.

References 

Unions of Bhaluka Upazila